Simon Istolainen is a French film producer, known for his work with Alain Goldman.

Filmography
 Les gamins, (2013)
 Robin des bois, la véritable histoire, (2015)
 All Three of Us, (2015)
 Sons of God, (2017)
 The Bar Mitzvah, (2018)
 Bad Seeds, (2018)
 Angel, (2018)
 Sublet, (2020)
 Brutus VS Cesar, (2020)
 Boutchou, (2020)

References

French film producers
1984 births
Living people